Georgia is a state located in the Southern United States. According to the 2010 United States Census, Georgia is the 8th most populous state with  inhabitants and the 21st largest by land area spanning  of land. Georgia is divided into 159 counties and contains 535 municipalities consisting of cities, towns, consolidated city-counties, and consolidated cities.

There is no legal difference in Georgia between cities and towns. Eight municipalities have merged with their counties to form consolidated city-counties: Athens with Clarke County, Augusta with Richmond County, Columbus with Muscogee County, Cusseta with Chattahoochee County, Georgetown with Quitman County, Macon with Bibb County, Statenville with Echols County, and Webster County unified government with Webster County. Athens and Augusta also have municipalities independent of the consolidated governments and are considered consolidated cities.

The largest municipality by population in Georgia is Atlanta, with 498,715 residents, and the smallest municipality by population is Aldora, with 0 residents. The largest municipality by land area is Augusta, a consolidated city-county, which spans , and Edge Hill and Santa Claus are tied for the smallest, at  each.

List of municipalities

Notes

See also
 Georgia statistical areas
 List of counties in Georgia (U.S. state)

References

External links
 Georgia Municipal Association

Municipalities
Georgia, List of cities in
Georgia